This is a list of windmills in Anglesey, Wales.

Locations
There were 49 windmills in Anglesey.

==Notes==

Mills in bold are still standing, known building dates are indicated in bold. Text in italics denotes indicates that the information is not confirmed, but is likely to be the case stated.

References

Anglesey
Windmills, Anglesey
Tourist attractions in Anglesey